Wartha is a town in the subdivision of Wartha-Göringen which forms part of the independent-city district of Eisenach in Thuringia state, Germany.

Near Wartha was a former major road border crossing on the Inner German border between East and West Germany. The crossing was known as Herleshausen-Wartha, with Herleshausen being the first town across the border in Hesse.

Neighboring municipalities and cities
To the west of Wartha is the Hessian town Herleshausen. To the north and the east are the towns of Neuenhof and Hörschel while Göringen in the south.

Gallery

External links

www.eisenach.de - Official website of the Wartburg Eisenach

Towns in Thuringia
Inner German border
Eisenach